Mosseruds GF is a sports club in Karlstad, Sweden, established on 8 September 1938. In 2010, the men's bandy team qualified for the Swedish second division.

References

External links
Official website 

Bandy clubs in Sweden
Bandy clubs established in 1938
1938 establishments in Sweden
Sport in Karlstad